Kevin Penkin (born 22 May 1992) is a British-born Australian composer, primarily for video games and anime. He is best known for composing the score of the anime Made in Abyss, which won Best Score at the 2nd Crunchyroll Anime Awards, and the score for the Tower of God anime adaptation, which won Best Score at the 5th Crunchyroll Anime Awards.

Biography
Penkin was born on 22 May 1992 in the United Kingdom, and grew up in Perth, Western Australia. Penkin's interest in video game music started from when he first heard the "Phendrana Drifts" theme from Metroid Prime; in a 2012 interview, he referred to the theme's electronic synths and acoustic instruments as "absolute bliss".

Penkin began his career with composition credits in the 2011 short films Play Lunch and The Adventures of Chipman and Biscuit Boy. In the same year, Penkin composed the soundtrack of the video game Jūzaengi: Engetsu Sangokuden; this soundtrack represented Penkin's first collaboration with Nobuo Uematsu. Penkin has continued to collaborate with Uematsu in titles such as Norn9 and Defender's Quest II: Mists of Ruin.

In 2013, Penkin received a Bachelor of Music in Composition and Music Technology at Edith Cowan University's Western Australian Academy of Performing Arts. In 2015, Penkin graduated from the Royal College of Music with a Master of Composition degree in Composition for Screen. His studies were supported by a grant from the Tait Memorial Trust as the inaugural Tait Scholar at the Royal College of Music.

In 2016, Penkin collaborated with Kinema Citrus on the Norn9 anime and the Under the Dog original video animation soundtracks. Penkin's relationship with Kinema Citrus continued through to 2017 for the soundtrack of Made in Abyss, winning the 2017 Crunchyroll Anime Award for Best Score with it. In 2018, Penkin composed the score for the video game Florence. Penkin composed the music for Kinema Citrus' anime adaptation of The Rising of the Shield Hero and NetEase's VR game Nostos in 2019. He composed the score for the 2020 anime adaptation of the South Korean webtoon Tower of God. Penkin was working with artist Takashi Murakami on the sequel to the movie Jellyfish Eyes, but the project was cancelled due to the COVID-19 pandemic. In 2021, Penkin composed the score for "The Village Bride" episode in the Disney+ animated anthology series Star Wars: Visions.

Penkin lived in the United Kingdom for some time, but now lives in Melbourne, Australia.

Works

Anime

Video games

Concert works

References

External links
Official website

1992 births
Living people
Alumni of the Royal College of Music
Anime composers
Australian film score composers
Crunchyroll Anime Awards winners
Male film score composers
Musicians from Perth, Western Australia
Video game composers